The Canadian Coast Guard College (CCGC) is a maritime training college and Canadian Coast Guard facility located in Westmount, Nova Scotia—a suburb of the former city of Sydney in the Cape Breton Regional Municipality.

The CCGC core training program revolves around a 4-year Officer Cadet program that prepares navigation and engineering officers for service on Canadian Coast Guard ships.  These cadets receive a Bachelor of Technology (Nautical Science) that is granted in collaboration with Cape Breton University.  Other training programs include a 6-month program for Marine Communications and Traffic Services Officers that specializes in radiotelephony procedures for marine safety and vessel traffic services to co-ordinate and monitor vessel movements in Canada's territorial waters.  Canadian Coast Guard officers that work in the nation's Joint Rescue Coordination Centres (JRCCs) also undertake advanced training at CCGC where a mock-up of a JRCC exists for simulation and training purposes.  Additionally, various courses and training programs exist for specialized positions in CCG, including administrative courses, search and rescue, and environmental response.

History

Established in 1965 as a residential college on the site of the former navy base  located at Point Edward along the western shore of Sydney Harbour, CCGC's first mandate was to train young men in 4-year diplomas of Marine Engineering or Marine Navigation for the Coast Guard's Officer Training Program.  The Officer Training Program expanded in 1973 to include women.

In 1981, CCGC moved from its location on the former Point Edward naval base to an adjacent custom-built 120 acre (486,000 m²) campus in neighbouring Westmount.  The campus, designed by Nova Scotia Architect Keith L. Graham  is located in a wooded area immediately south of Point Edward and adjacent to Petersfield Provincial Park.  It consists of a variety of interlinked residential, training, administration, and health/fitness facilities.  CCGC also has simulators for depicting the navigation of vessels in a variety of scenarios, dry-land mock-ups of vessel engine rooms, and a simulator for a rescue coordination centre (RCC).

CCGC has a small fleet of training vessels ranging from sail boats and rigid hull inflatable boats (RHIB) and one   motor life boat- all housed in a custom-built boathouse on the college's waterfront along a small cove.

From the 1980s to the 2000s (decade), the college expanded its training programs to include customized marine training for students from Commonwealth Caribbean nations, as well as other federal government agencies such as the Royal Canadian Mounted Police, Department of Fisheries and Oceans, and the Department of Transport.

In the 1995, the 4 year Officer Training Program was granted degree accreditation through an agreement with the University College of Cape Breton, since renamed Cape Breton University.  Following completion of the Officer Training program, graduates now receive a Bachelor of Technology (Nautical Science or nautical engineering) from CBU.

Training programs

Following training programs are offered:

 Officer Training Program (OTP)
 Marine Navigation
 Marine Engineering
 Marine Communications and Traffic Services (MCTS) Officer Program
 Electronics and Informatics Technical Training  (EITT)

Departments
 Marine Communications and Traffic Services
 Electronics and Informatics Technical Training 
 Marine Engineering (Officer Training Program)
 Navigation (Officer Training Program, Search and Rescue, Environmental Response)
 Arts, Sciences and Languages (Officer Training Program)
 Superintendent of Officer Cadets (Officer Training Program)

Training vessels

There is one vessel assigned to the College:

 CCGS Goéland

In 2011 CCGS CG 117 and  CCGS CG 118 were retired as training vessels.

See also
 Canadian Coast Guard
 Royal Military College of Canada

References

External links
 Canadian Coast Guard College - official website

Canadian Coast Guard
Education in the Cape Breton Regional Municipality
Universities and colleges in Nova Scotia
Maritime colleges in Canada
Coast guard academies
Educational institutions established in 1965
1965 establishments in Nova Scotia